Tatyana Rodionova may refer to

Tatyana Rodionova (born 1941), Russian volleyball player
Tatyana Rodionova (long jumper) (born 1956), Russian long jumper 
Tatyana Rodionova (runner) (born 1980), Russian middle-distance runner